James Landay is professor of computer science at Stanford University, He specializes in human–computer interaction. He was formerly professor of information science at Cornell Tech in New York City and before that professor of computer science and engineering at the University of Washington. He received his BS in EECS from UC Berkeley, and his MS and PhD in Computer Science from Carnegie Mellon University.

References 

Living people
University of California, Berkeley alumni
Carnegie Mellon University alumni
Stanford University faculty
University of Washington faculty
Year of birth missing (living people)
American computer scientists